Alaya High (born January 28, 2007), professionally known as That Girl Lay Lay, is an American singer, rapper and child actress best known for starring in the 2021 Nickelodeon sitcom That Girl Lay Lay. She became the youngest female African American rapper to have a record deal with Empire Distribution at 11 years old, with her debut single "Go, Lay Lay, Go" and debut album Tha Cheat Code (2018). She has also worked on a series of books with Scholastic publishing.

Career

Music 
Alaya High was born in Houston, Texas, on January 28, 2007. She got her start in music when her parents posted videos of her rapping covers to hip-hop songs on YouTube, and rapping covers of different Christian rap songs for the youth ministry at her local church her family attended. She subsequently began writing her own rap and hip hop songs that she posted on YouTube and Instagram.

In 2018, she was given a recording contract with Empire Distribution under the record label, Fresh Rebel Musik, and recorded her debut album, "Tha Cheat Code," and also recorded a single to accompany the album,  "Go, Lay Lay, Go", with Empire. After rising to fame with Tha Cheat Code and Go, Lay Lay, Go, she was invited to perform at the 2019 93rd Annual Macy's Thanksgiving Day Parade,  and went on to perform at Nickelodeon's All-Star Nickmas Holiday Spectacular in 2020. She also performed on the Ellen DeGeneres show while promoting her new album.

High became one of the youngest female rappers to be given a record deal at 11 years old, and went on to record other children's and teen-themed rap and hip hop albums with Empire such as Tha Cheat Code Reloaded (2019), All Tha Way Lit Up (2019), and Recess Is Over (2020). She also released several singles, both by herself and as collaborations with other rappers such as Mama (2019), Long Hair (2020), Show and Tell (2020), Jingle Rock Baby (a Christmas single, 2020), A World by Us (2021), and I'm That! (in collaboration with fellow Nickelodeon child actor and rapper, Young Dylan, in 2021). She also performed at the 2022 Nickelodeon Kid's Choice Awards.

Acting 
High made her acting debut in 2019 when she did minor voice roles for the movie, The Lego Movie 2: The Second Part, and collaborated on the theme song for the film's soundtrack, Catchy Song, with rapper T-Pain. In 2020, she signed a deal with Nickelodeon to develop original multi-platform programming, music initiatives, and build a consumer product business catering to children and teens, and highlighting young actors and creative artists. As a part of this deal, High was given her own television series on Nickelodeon, That Girl Lay Lay, where she currently plays as an artificially intelligent avatar on a phone app that comes to life as a human teen girl, when the owner of the phone, Sadie, wishes she had a friend who could help her stand out and be more outgoing in her high school career and social life. The show premiered on Nickelodeon on September 23, 2021, and was renewed for a second ongoing season on January 28, 2022. It premiered July 14, 2022. High has also guest starred in other Nickelodeon series such as Side Hustle, Tyler Perry's Young Dylan, and Danger Force.

Filmography

Discography

Albums

Singles

Awards 

|-
! scope="row" | 2022
| NAACP Image Awards
| Outstanding Performance by a Youth
| Alaya High
| 
| 
|-
! scope="row" | 2022
| Crown Awards
| Young CROWN Award
| Alaya High
| 
| 
|-
! scope="row" | 2022
| Women in Toys, Licensing & Entertainment
| Wonder Girl Award
| Alaya High
| 
|

Notes
Coauthor of the song but did not perform on it.

References

Living people
Television child actresses
21st-century American rappers
African-American rappers
American women rappers
21st-century women rappers
2007 births